Robert Frank Henry (born 28 June 1954) is a British former motorcycle speedway rider, who rode for Mildenhall Fen Tigers for eleven seasons, later going on to manage the team.

Biography
Born in Exeter, Henry's first speedway races were in second-half events at Exeter Falcons in 1974. 

In 1975 he moved on to Mildenhall Fen Tigers, and won the Suffolk Junior Open Championship. In 1976 he broke into the Mildenhall team and scored solidly, averaging close to five points per match, with one full maximum score. By 1979 he was established as one of Mildenhall's top riders, averaging close to nine points per match, and maintained consistently high scores for the team until his retirement in 1986. He was part of Mildenhall's National League winning team of 1979.

During his career he also had several guest rides in the top flight British League, including spells at Newport, Hackney Hawks, Belle Vue Aces, Swindon Robins, and at Leicester Lions for whom he rode in nineteen matches in 1979. He was offered a place in the Leicester team in 1980 but decided to stay with Mildenhall.

In 2011, Henry was appointed as team manager to the Fen Tigers, and went on to win the National League Knock Out Cup in his first season in charge.

References

1954 births
Living people
British speedway riders
English motorcycle racers
Sportspeople from Exeter
Mildenhall Fen Tigers riders
Swindon Robins riders
Leicester Lions riders
Newport Wasps riders
Hackney Hawks riders
Belle Vue Aces riders
Exeter Falcons riders
Cradley Heathens riders
Wimbledon Dons riders